Home Daughters is a patriotic youth paramilitary organization in Estonia, established in 1932 at Estonian Defence League. It is not a defence organisation.

In 1939, there were registered 19,601 Home Daughters.

In 1940, the organisation was eliminated due to the Soviet occupation of Estonia.

In 1991, the organisation was re-established after the restoration of Estonian independence.

In 2021, there were registered ~4500 Home Daughters.

Leaders:
 1933-1940 Salme Pruuden
 1992-1999 Maret Lepik
 1999-2002 Anne Eenpalu
 2002-2018 Angelika Naris
 2018-... Ave Proos

See also
 Scouting and Guiding in Estonia

References

External links
 

Youth organizations based in Estonia
Military of Estonia